The 1887 Rhode Island gubernatorial election was held on April 6, 1887. Democratic nominee John W. Davis defeated incumbent Republican George P. Wetmore with 51.50% of the vote.

General election

Candidates
Major party candidates
John W. Davis, Democratic
George P. Wetmore, Republican

Other candidates
Thomas H. Peabody, Prohibition

Results

References

1887
Rhode Island
Gubernatorial